Napoleonville is a village and the parish seat of Assumption Parish, in the U.S. state of Louisiana. The population was 660 at the 2010 census. It is part of the Pierre Part Micropolitan Statistical Area. The village is best known as the location where the film Because of Winn-Dixie, based on Kate DiCamillo's Newbery Prize-winning novel, was shot. The book was set in (fictional) Naomi, Florida.

History 

As early as 1807 the community that later became Napoleonville was known as "Canal". This canal extended west from Napoleonville to Lake Verret. The village that later developed was named by a former French soldier who served under Napoleon Bonaparte.  The French veteran, Pierre Charlet, is buried in the cemetery of Our Lady of the Assumption Catholic Church in the nearby community of Plattenville in Assumption Parish.

The first permanent settlements in this region were made by the French and Spanish (including Isleños) about the middle of the 18th century along Bayou Lafourche, between the present towns of Donaldsonville and Napoleonville. From 1755 to 1785, the population was increased by the immigration of the exiled Acadians who settled in the area, clearing the land and building comfortable homes. The town was officially incorporated on March 11, 1878.

Geography 

Napoleonville is located at  (29.937778, -91.026750).

Demographics

2020 census

As of the 2020 United States census, there were 540 people, 229 households, and 137 families residing in the village.

2000 census
As of the census of 2000, there were 686 people, 246 households, and 170 families residing in the village. The racial makeup of the village was 29.01% White, 69.83% African American, 0.44% Native American, and 0.73% from two or more races. Hispanic or Latino of any race were 0.29% of the population.

There were 246 households, out of which 30.1% had children under the age of 18 living with them, 37.0% were married couples living together, 27.6% had a female householder with no husband present, and 30.5% were non-families. 25.2% of all households were made up of individuals, and 12.6% had someone living alone who was 65 years of age or older. The average household size was 2.79 and the average family size was 3.40.

In the village, the population was spread out, with 28.1% under the age of 18, 10.1% from 18 to 24, 26.8% from 25 to 44, 21.1% from 45 to 64, and 13.8% who were 65 years of age or older. The median age was 34 years. For every 100 females, there were 81.5 males. For every 100 females age 18 and over, there were 75.4 males.

The median income for a household in the village was $18,977, and the median income for a family was $21,339. Males had a median income of $26,750 versus $16,607 for females. The per capita income for the village was $12,005. About 31.4% of families and 31.8% of the population were below the poverty line, including 48.8% of those under age 18 and 16.7% of those age 65 or over.

Notable people

Troy E. Brown, former member of the Louisiana State Senate and native of Napoloenville
Paul Carmouche, former district attorney for Caddo Parish
Papa Celestin, jazz bandleader
Philip H. Gilbert, politician, former lieutenant governor
Joe Harrison, state representative
Brandon Jacobs, retired NFL running back
Samuel A. LeBlanc I, state representative, state court judge, justice of the Louisiana Supreme Court from 1949 to 1954
Charlie Melançon, former U.S. representative
Jordan Mills, NFL offensive lineman
J.C. Politz, sportscaster
Risley C. Triche, attorney, former state representative
Tramon Williams, NFL cornerback
Kim Willoughby, Team USA Volleyball (2008 Beijing Olympics)

National Guard 

The village is home to the 928th Sapper Company, a combat engineer unit of the 769th Engineer Battalion of the Louisiana Army National Guard which in turn is headquartered at Baton Rouge. Both of these units belong to the 225th Engineer Brigade headquartered at Camp Beauregard near Pineville.

Twin towns 

The town maintains twinning links with:
  Pontivy (Napoléonville in 1804), France since 1989

References 

 
Populated places established in 1807
Villages in Assumption Parish, Louisiana
Villages in Louisiana
Parish seats in Louisiana
Louisiana Isleño communities